Cholai is an Indian Bengali dark comedy film releasing in 2016. The film is based on the 2011 hooch fatalities. in Bengal, India. Unlicensed Country liquor, commonly known as ‘Cholai’ is a prosper business in rural Bengal.It is very cheap and highly addictive.

Plot
Skaktipada is a reputed teacher in his village.  He has three sons, the eldest son Nimai sells milk for a living. Shaktipada’s second son Nitya is a fraud and has been absconding since a year. His youngest son Nata makes local alcohol and his disputed reputation exceeds the boundary of locality. The secret of the addiction of his alcohol is the presence of some pesticides in them. Nata and his wife work hard to keep the business afloat. One day accidentally both of them mix pesticides to the alcohol in the brewing process not knowing their partner as already done it. This leads to the death of 172 people who had consumed this poisonous alcohol.

Overnight this creates a huge unrest in the village as well as the media. To mitigate the unrest Government declares a lucrative compensation of 2 lakhs for the families of the dead. Peoples’ excitement takes mercurial height with the announcement.  People starting from the doctor in the morgue to the carriers of the dead bodies, all became conscious of the compensation amount and demand their share in it.

A parallel incident soon draws public’s attention. The Govt. declares another compensation package to the families of the Maoist workers who are going to surrender. To the utter surprise of the villagers, Shaktipada’s long-unseen second son Nitya was seen queuing up with other Maoist activists to receive compensation. Sumitra, Nata’s wife is disheartened to see his brother-in-law get this kind of money. She thinks that Govt. gives money to people who kill others. And since Nata has killed 172 people he should be entitled to some compensation as well. A convinced Nata surrenders to the Govt. seeking pardon and compensation to start a new life.

Now only Nimai, the eldest, the milk seller finds himself at a loss. He is bullied by his wife to learn from his brothers who have both fame and money. Will Nimai now do something drastic to change is life ... to gain “fame” and “compensation”? Well, he does.

Cast
 Saswata Chatterjee as Minister
 Kharaj Mukherjee as Bus Passenger
 Partha Sarathi as Nata
 Sandip Ghosh as Nimai
 Sumit Sammadar as Bishu
 Shankar Chakraborty as Doctor
 Mishka Halim
 Goutam Halder
 Swapna Dey
 Sneha Biswas
 Subhomay Chatterjee
 Rayati Basu
 Sounava Basu
 Arunima Ghosh

Crew
 Produced By: Jaspreet Kaur
 Production House: KR Movies & Entertainment Pvt Ltd
 Creative Producer: Pavel
 Directed By: Arun Roy
 Screenplay: Arun Roy
 Dialogues: Subhomay Chatterjee
 cinematography: Gopi Bhagat
 Music Director: Mayukh & Mainak
 Editor: Sanglap Bhowmick & Edit FX

Music
The music of the film has been composed by Mayukh & Mainak

Recognition
Cholai has been screened at several prestigious International Film Festivals. The film  was screened at the prestigious Cannes Film Festival and 7th Jagran Film Festival. Cholai was nominated for 63rd National Film Awards and was also nominated in six categories at Madrid IFF 2016 and won 1 award. The movie was officially selected for Indian film festival of Melbourne, Australia. Cholai was well-received internationally.
Cholai wins two film fare awards in the Jio Filmfare Awards (East) 2017. It secured the awards for Best Dialogue (Subhomay Chatterjee) & Critics' Best Film (Arun Roy).

References

External links
 

Films set in Kolkata
Indian black comedy films
2016 films
Bengali-language Indian films
2010s Bengali-language films